Hornstein may refer to:

 Hornstein (rock), a silicate-rich chemical sediment and one of the siliceous rocks
 Hornstein (surname)
 Hornstein, Austria, Burgenland
 6712 Hornstein (1990 DS1), a Main-belt Asteroid (f. 1990)
 Horenstein (disambiguation)
 von Hornstein, name of a family of imperial knights in the south of Germany, near Riedlingen